Erotikon is a 1929 silent erotic melodrama film by Czech director Gustav Machatý based on a screenplay by Vítězslav Nezval.

Production
The shooting started in November 1928. Exterior scenes were shot in Prague and Karlovy Vary. Machatý and his cinematographer Václav Vích used modern American lenses making the image very soft. Production designers were Julius von Borsody and Alexandr Hackenschmied.

Cast
 Olaf Fjord as George Sydney, a travelling seducer
 Ita Rina as Andrea, an innocent girl
 Karel Schleichert as Andrea's father, the railway crossing keeper
 Theodor Pištěk as Hilbert
 Charlotte Susa as Gilda
 Luigi Serventi as Jan

Release
The premiere was held in Karlovy Vary on 27 February 1929. The movie was praised by critics for its Soviet-style montage and visual storytelling through symbolic imagery; however, most journalists criticised its weak story.

Versions
In 1933 Czech and German sound versions were made with the music by Erno Košťál. Both versions were substantially cut. The movie was reconstructed by Czech Film Archive in 1994 with new chamber music by Jan Klusák. Klusák composed alternative music score for full orchestra in 1995.

References

External links
 
 Erotikon (1929) full film (public domain) at Archive.org

1929 films
Czech erotic drama films
Czech silent feature films
1929 drama films
Czech black-and-white films
Melodrama films
1920s erotic drama films
Silent drama films